7th Anniversary Best is the fourth compilation album by J-pop duo Two-Mix, released by WEA Japan on April 24, 2002. The album covers the duo's singles, B-sides, and other tracks from 1998 to 2001.

The album peaked at No. 58 on Oricon's weekly albums chart.

Track listing 
All lyrics are written by Shiina Nagano; all music is composed by Minami Takayama, except where indicated; all music is arranged by Two-Mix, except where indicated.

Charts

References

External links 
 
 
 

2002 compilation albums
Two-Mix compilation albums
Japanese-language compilation albums
Warner Music Japan compilation albums